Belle-Vue Brewery is a brewery founded in 1913 in Molenbeek, Brussels by Philémon Vandenstock from nearby Itterbeek, which lies in a region known for its lambic type of beer. A variety of Belle-Vue lambic and fruit beers are produced in Sint-Pieters-Leeuw.

Products
Four varieties of spontaneous fermentation beers containing 5.5% abv are produced: Belle-Vue Gueuze, Kriek, Kriek Extra and Raspberry.  It is the best-known brand of Belgian fruit beer though its sweet taste is far from representing that of traditional sour lambics. Belle-Vue's sole traditional product, Selection Lambic, is produced in very limited quantity (it has not been produced since 1999).

Notes

Belgian brands
Breweries of Brussels
Molenbeek-Saint-Jean